Lake Wilson may refer to one of these locations:

Lake Wilson (Arkansas County, Arkansas), a lake in Arkansas County, Arkansas, USA
Lake Wilson (Washington County, Arkansas), a lake in Washington County, Arkansas, USA
Lake Wilson, Minnesota, a town in Leeds Township, Murray County, USA
Lake Wilson (Murray County, Minnesota), USA
Lake Wilson, a lake in Hawaii, USA
Lake Wilson (New Zealand), a mountain tarn which is the source of the Routeburn River

See also 
 Wilson Lake (disambiguation)